Enskede IK is a Swedish football club located in Gamla Enskede, Stockholm.

Background
Since their foundation in 1914 Enskede IK has participated mainly in the lower divisions of the Swedish football league system but since 2004 they have resided in Division 2.  The club currently plays in Division 2 Södra Svealand which is the fourth tier of Swedish football. They play their home matches at the Enskede IP in Enskede.

Today EIK is one of Sweden's biggest football clubs with over 140 teams. A few years ago, Enskede IK had bandy and hockey teams, too, but today it is just a football club.

From 1989–2005, the club president was the Swedish politician Bo Ringholm.

Season to season

Attendances

In recent seasons Enskede IK have had the following average attendances:

First-team squad

Notable alumni

 Noah Sonko Sundberg
 Anton Salétros
 Oscar Krusnell
 Oliver Dovin
 Benny Lekström
 Björn Runström
 Daniel Örlund
 Andi Toompuu
 Magdalena Eriksson

External links
 Enskede IK – Official Website

Footnotes

Football clubs in Stockholm
Association football clubs established in 1914
1914 establishments in Sweden